Kosmos 18 ( meaning Cosmos 18) or Zenit-2 No.11 was a Soviet optical film-return reconnaissance satellite launched in 1963. A Zenit-2 satellite, Kosmos 18 was the eleventh of eighty-one such spacecraft to be launched.

Spacecraft
Kosmos 18 was a Zenit-2 satellite, a first generation, low resolution, reconnaissance satellite derived from the Vostok spacecraft used for crewed flights, the satellites were developed by OKB-1. In addition to reconnaissance, it was also used for research into radiation in support of the Vostok programme.

Launch
The Vostok-2 rocket, serial number E15000-12, was used to launch Kosmos 18. The launch took place at 10:48:00 GMT on 24 May 1963, using Site 1/5 at the Baikonur Cosmodrome. Following its successful arrival in orbit the spacecraft received its Kosmos designation, along with the International Designator 1963-018A and the Satellite Catalog Number 00586.

Mission
Kosmos 18 was operated in a low Earth orbit. Having spent nine days in orbit, the spacecraft was deorbited on 2 June 1963. Its return capsule descended under parachute and was recovered by the Soviet forces in the steppe in Kazakhstan. In addition to its imaging mission, Kosmos 18 was used to conduct measurements of radiation levels in low Earth orbit.

See also

 1963 in spaceflight

References

Spacecraft launched in 1963
Kosmos satellites
Spacecraft which reentered in 1963
Zenit-2 satellites